Life saver may refer to:

Life saving
A person who participates in lifesaving
Lifebuoy, a buoy designed to be thrown to a person in the water to provide buoyancy and prevent drowning
Personal flotation device, a piece of equipment worn to keep the wearer afloat

Music

Songs
"Life Saver", a song by Chicago from their album Chicago VII
"Lifesaver" (song), a 2004 song by Emiliana Torrini
"Lifesaver", a song from Guru's 1995 album, Guru's Jazzmatazz, Vol. 2: The New Reality
"Lifesaver", a song by Finnish band Sunrise Avenue from their album Unholy Ground

Other music
Lifesavas, similarly named hip-hop group from Portland, Oregon
The Lifesaver, a 1974 album by pianist Joe Bonner 
Lifesavers Underground, a Christian rock band

Other uses
LifeSaver bottle, used to turn dirty/polluted water into drinking water
Life Savers, a brand of candy
Life Savers (film), a 1916 film starring Oliver Hardy
Life Savers Building, Port Chester, Westchester County, New York, United States
Operation Lifesaver, a rail safety organization in the United States
Project Lifesaver, a non-profit organization for locating missing persons with dementia, autism, Down syndrome and other related illnesses

See also
Life preserver (disambiguation)